Hickory Corners may refer to a place in the United States:

 Hickory Corners, Michigan, a census-designated place in Barry County
 Hickory Corners, New York, a hamlet in Niagara County
 Hickory Corners, Tennessee, an unincorporated community in Chester County.
 Hickory Corners, Wisconsin, an unincorporated community in Oconto County